The black shinner (Pseudopungtungia nigra) is a species of cyprinid fish endemic to South Korea. It is also a type species of genus Pseudopungtungia.

References

Pseudopungtungia
Fish described in 1935